Glamazon is the sixth studio album from American singer and drag queen RuPaul. It was released on iTunes through RuCo on April 25, 2011, coinciding with the third season finale of RuPaul's Drag Race. The album is a mix of dance, electropop, R&B, and hip-hop.

Promotion
The music video for the title track, "Glamazon" was released on 12 April 2012 via logotv.com. It features the three finalists of the fourth season of Rupaul's Drag Race, Sharon Needles, Phi Phi O'Hara, and Chad Michaels as giant glamazon characters in a retro-style video game, terrorizing such locales as the Pyramids of Giza, the Palace of Westminster, and the Leaning Tower of Pisa. The celebrities who were featured as guest judges over the course of the fourth season of Drag Race are seen in these places being stomped under the queens' heels or otherwise massacred by them. At the video's conclusion, an even larger Rupaul shows up and crushes the three queens under her own stiletto. At the end of the video Sharon Needles shows as the High Scorer.

All tracks from the album (with the exception of "Click Clack (Make Dat Money)" and "Get Your Rebel On", have received remixes from various remix EPs.

A Music video for "Responsitrannity" was released with a Remix showing the Contestants and Guest Judges From All Stars.
The song was inspired by RuPaul's first season fight with Tammie Brown.

Reception

Commercial
Glamazon debuted at number 11 and number 8 on Billboard's Dance/Electronic Albums and Top Heatseekers charts, respectively. The digital-only release sold 2,000 copies, RuPaul's highest first-week sales since 1997.

The album's lead single, "Superstar", also sold 3,000 copies during the first week of release.

Track listing

Chart performance

Singles

References

2011 albums
Albums produced by Lucian Piane
RuPaul albums